Elin Ahlin (born 15 December 1990) is a Swedish sport shooter.

She participated at the 2018 ISSF World Shooting Championships, winning a medal.

References

External links

Living people
1990 births
Swedish female sport shooters
ISSF rifle shooters
21st-century Swedish women